Alejandro Patronelli (born 22 May 1978) is an Argentine rally raid driver (quad), two-times winner the Dakar Rally (quads). Brother of the three-times winner Marcos Patronelli.

Dakar Rally

References

External links 
 Driver profile at WorldRallyRaid

1978 births
Living people
Dakar Rally drivers
Argentine motorcycle racers
Enduro riders
Dakar Rally winning drivers
Off-road motorcycle racers